Ctenochaetus marginatus is a tropical fish found in coral reefs in the Pacific Ocean. It was first named by Achille Valenciennes in 1835, and is commonly known as the striped-fin surgeonfish, the blue-spotted bristletooth, or the bluespotted surgeonfish. It is used in aquariums.

References

Acanthuridae
Fish described in 1835